Martin Kližan was the defending champion but decided not to participate.

Lukáš Lacko won the title defeating Ričardas Berankis in the final 7–6(9–7), 6–2.

Seeds

Draw

Finals

Top half

Bottom half

References
 Main Draw
 Qualifying Draw

Slovak Open - Singles
2011 Men's Singles